The 1969 NBA All-Star Game was an exhibition basketball game which was played on January 14, 1969, at the Baltimore Civic Center in Baltimore.

Teams

Eastern Conference

Western Conference

Score by periods

References 

National Basketball Association All-Star Game
All-Star
NBA All-Star Game
NBA All-Star Game
1960s in Baltimore